Siro-Paeonians or Siropaiones (Ancient Greek: Σιροπαίονες) were an ancient Paeonian tribe inhabiting the ancient city of Siris (present day Serres) and the Strymon plain. They were one of eight (Herodotus) or ten (Thucydides) tribes of Paeonia. They were situated from the Bisaltae and Odomanti to the south, Sinthi to the north, the Strymon to the east, Maedi to the west, and a mountain chain separating them from Crestonia. Their capital was Siris (Serres). They were defeated by Persian general Megabazus (486 BC). They were expelled by the Persians to Asia Minor, where they are assumed to have founded Serraepolis.

Legacy
The toponym Circipania has been connected to the tribal name.

See also
Peltast
Paeonians

References

Sources

The Histories (Penguin Classics) by Herodotus, John M. Marincola, and Aubery de Selincourt, 2003, page 315: "... was that a number of Paeonian tribes - the Siriopaeones, Paeoplae, ..."

Paeonian tribes